The 2015–16 Yale Bulldogs men's basketball team represented Yale University during the 2015–16 NCAA Division I men's basketball season. The Bulldogs, led by seventeenth year head coach James Jones, played their home games at John J. Lee Amphitheater of the Payne Whitney Gymnasium and were members of the Ivy League. They finished the season 23–7, 13–1 in Ivy League to win the Ivy League championship. They received the Ivy's automatic bid to the  NCAA tournament, their first NCAA bid since 1962, where they defeated Baylor in the first round to advance to the second round where they lost to Duke.

Previous season 
The Bulldogs lost their One-game playoff against Harvard 53–51. Despite having posted an 11–3 Ivy League record and a 22–10 overall record the Bulldogs weren't invited to a postseason tournament.

Departures

Recruiting

Recruiting class of 2016

Roster

Schedule

|-
!colspan=9 style="background:#00449E; color:#FFFFFF;"| Non-conference regular season

|-
!colspan=9 style="background:#00449E; color:#FFFFFF;"| Ivy League regular season

|-
!colspan=9 style="background:#00449E; color:#FFFFFF;"|NCAA tournament

Source: 2015–16 Yale Bulldogs men's basketball schedule

References

Yale Bulldogs men's basketball seasons
Yale
Yale
Yale Bulldogs
Yale Bulldogs